Byam was a snow launched at Oban, or possibly Padstow, in 1800. She made four voyages trading slaves between West Africa and the West Indies before the French captured and burnt her in late 1807 or early 1808 as she was about to deliver slaves on her fifth voyage.

Career
Byam entered Lloyd's Register in 1800 with J. French, master, Stevenson, owner, and trade Liverpool−Antigua. The next year it reported that her master had changed from J. French to G. Martin, her owner from "Grcocut" to Rodie & Co., and her trade from Liverpool−Antigua to Liverpool–Africa.

1st slave voyage (1801–1802): Captain George Martin sailed from Liverpool on 10 November 1801. It is not clear where Byam gathered her slaves, but she delivered them to Saint Vincent on 16 June 1802. There she landed 199 slaves. She sailed from St Vincent on 31 July and arrived back at Liverpool on 15 September. She had left Liverpool with 22 crew members and suffered eight crew deaths on her voyage.

2nd slave voyage (1802–1804): Captain Martin sailed from Liverpool on 16 October 1802. She gathered her slaves at Rio Pongo. She left Africa on 14 May 1803, and arrived at Barbados on 24 June 1803. Captain Martin died there and Captain James Seddon replaced him. Byam sailed on to Demerara. She had embarked 205 or 208 slaves, and she landed 193, for a mortality rate of 6%. She sailed from Demerara on 14 November and arrived at Liverpool on 24 January 1804. She had left Liverpool with 24 crew members and suffered eight crew deaths on her voyage.

3rd slave voyage (1804–1805): Captain John Bradley sailed from Liverpool on 18 July 1804. Byam delivered the slaves she had gathered to Suriname, where she arrived 7 November. There she landed 204. She left Suriname on 27 January 1805 and arrived back at Liverpool on 29 March. She had left Liverpool with 23 crew members and she suffered 13 crew deaths on the voyage.

4th slave voyage (1805–1806): Captain John Bradley acquired a letter of marque on 13 July 1805. He sailed from Liverpool on 3 August 1805. Lloyd's List (LL) reported on 11 February 1806 that Byam, Bradley, master, had arrived at the Congo. She had grounded at Shark's Point but had been gotten off. She had had to throw eight of her guns overboard, and unload her ammunition and provisions to lighten her. Byam gathered her slaves at the Congo River and arrived at Dutch Guiana on 20 March 1606. There she landed 25 slaves.

Byam then sailed to Demerara, where she landed 168 slaves. She sailed for home on 22 May and arrived back at Liverpool on 11 July. She had left Liverpool with 31 crew members and suffered two crew deaths on the voyage.

Fate
Captain Alexander Williams sailed Byam from Liverpool on 6 January 1807 on what was to have been her fifth slave trading voyage. She gathered her slaves at the Rio Pongo, and while there apparently suffered from a mass desertion of her crew. She eventually sailed with a cargo of slaves but was unable to deliver them.

Lloyd's List reported on 12 April 1808 that Byam had been taken. Her captors had driven her ashore at Guadeloupe and burnt her.

Notes, citations, and references
Notes

Citations

References
 

1800 ships
Age of Sail merchant ships of England
Liverpool slave ships
Maritime incidents in 1808
Captured ships
Ship fires
Scuttled vessels
Shipwrecks in the Caribbean Sea